Saint Sophia of Rome  is venerated as a Christian martyr. 
She is identified in hagiographical tradition with the figure of Sophia of Milan, the mother of Saints Faith, Hope and Charity, whose veneration is attested for the sixth century.

However, there are conflicting hagiographical traditions; one tradition makes Sophia herself a martyr under the Diocletian Persecution (303/4).
This conflicts with the much more widespread hagiographical tradition (BHL 2966, also extant in Greek, Armenian and Georgian versions) placing Sophia, the mother of Faith, Hope and Charity, in the time of Diocletian (early fourth century) and reporting her dying not as a martyr but mourning for her martyred daughters.
Her relics are said to have been translated to the convent at Eschau, Alsace in 778, and her cult spread to Germany from there.  
Acta Sanctorum reports that her feast day of 15 May is attested in German, Belgian and English breviaries of the 16th century.

Roman Catholic hagiography of the early modern period attempted to identify the Saint Sophia venerated in Germany with various records of martyrs named Sophia recorded in the early medieval period, among them a record from the time of Pope Sergius II (9th century)  reporting an inscription mentioning a virgin martyr named Sophia at the high altar of the church of San Martino ai Monti. Saxer (2000) suggests that her veneration may indeed have originated in the later sixth century based on such inscriptions of the fourth to sixth centuries.

Based on her feast day on 15 May, she became one of the  "Ice Saints", the saints whose feast days are traditionally associated with the last possibility of frost in Central Europe.
She is known as kalte Sophie "cold Sophia" in Germany, and in Slovenia as poscana Zofka "pissy Sophia" or mokra Zofija "wet Sophia".

She is depicted on a column in the nave of St. Stephen's Cathedral in Vienna; it dates from the 15th century.

Churches
Churches dedicated to Sophia of Rome include:
 St. Sophia in Erbach, Odenwald, Germany
 St. Sophia in Brüssow, Germany
 St. Sophienkirche, Barmbek-Süd, Hamburg, Germany
 St. Sophie in Randau, Magdeburg, Germany
Santa Sofia d'Epiro, Italy
Chiesa di Santa Sofia, Capri, Italy
Santa Sofia,  Giugliano in Campania, Italy
Church of Santa Sofia, Lendinara, Italy
Santa Sofia, Naples, Italy
Chapelle Sainte-Sophie, Ille-et-Vilaine, France
Church of Vera, Nadejda, Lubov and their mother Sophia, Saint Petersburg, Russia
Church of Saints Sofia and Tatiana of Rome at Filatov Pediatric Clinical Hospital, Moscow, Russia

See also
Saints Faith, Hope and Charity
Holy Wisdom
Chiesa di Santa Sofia, Capri
Sophienkirche

References

Ante-Nicene Christian martyrs
Christians martyred during the reign of Diocletian
304 deaths